The Secret of the Chinese Carnation is a 1964 German-Italian krimi eurospy film directed by Rudolf Zehetgruber and starring Paul Dahlke, Olga Schoberová, Klaus Kinski and Dietmar Schönherr. It is based on a novel by Louis Weinert-Wilton, one of four film adaptations of his work released in the wake of the commercial success of Rialto Film's Edgar Wallace series.

It was shot at the Barrandov Studios in Prague and on location in the city. The film's sets were designed by the art director Otto Renelt.

Cast

References

Bibliography

External links

1964 films
1960s spy thriller films
West German films
1960s German-language films
German black-and-white films
Italian black-and-white films
Films directed by Rudolf Zehetgruber
German spy thriller films
Italian spy thriller films
Films based on Czech novels
Films set in London
Films shot in Prague
Films shot at Barrandov Studios
Constantin Film films
1960s Italian films
1960s German films